Felipa Colón de Toledo y Mosquera, 2nd Duchess of Veragua, 2nd Duchess of la Vega, 2nd Marchioness of Jamaica (c. 1550 – 25 November 1577), was the second daughter and heiress of Luis Colón de Toledo, 1st Duke of Veragua and of la Vega, and his first wife María de Mosquera y Pasamonte. She was a great-granddaughter of famous explorer Christopher Columbus.

She married her first cousin Diego Colón de Toledo, 4th Admiral of the Indies; they had no children. Her husband held that office, which she had inherited, in her place.

See also
Dukedom of Veragua
Veragua
Pleitos colombinos

References

Felipa
103
Spanish duchesses
People of the Spanish colonial Americas
16th-century Spanish nobility
1550s births
1577 deaths
Colony of Santiago
Colonial Panama
16th-century South American people